Labicymbium dentichele is a species of sheet weaver found in Peru. It was described by Millidge in 1991.

References

Linyphiidae
Endemic fauna of Peru
Spiders of South America
Spiders described in 1991